Yan Yinhua (born 12 August 1968) is a Chinese former cyclist. She competed in the women's individual road race at the 1988 Summer Olympics.

References

External links
 

1968 births
Living people
Chinese female cyclists
Olympic cyclists of China
Cyclists at the 1988 Summer Olympics
Place of birth missing (living people)
20th-century Chinese women